Melchior Lussy or Melchior Lussi (1529–1606) was a Swiss Catholic statesman who represented the Catholic cantons of Switzerland in the Council of Trent.

References

1529 births
1606 deaths